The Torchbearers is a 1962 bronze sculpture by Charles Umlauf, installed outside the Flawn Academic Center on the University of Texas at Austin campus in Austin, Texas, United States. It was cast in Milan at the Fonderia Battaglia.

See also

 1962 in art

References

External links

 The Statues of UT: Interactive Map by The Daily Texan

1962 establishments in Texas
1962 sculptures
Bronze sculptures in Texas
Outdoor sculptures in Austin, Texas
Sculptures of men in Texas
Statues in Austin, Texas
University of Texas at Austin campus